Middleham Chapel is a historic Episcopal church located in Lusby, Calvert County, Maryland.  It is a one-story, cruciform, Flemish bond brick structure with exposed fieldstone foundations. It was built in 1748, to replace an earlier frame or log structure believed to have been erected as early as 1684, as a Chapel of Ease of Christ Church Parish.  The date of construction is worked into the brick on the front of the church.

It was listed on the National Register of Historic Places in 1975.

Middleham Chapel is still in use today. In 1900 it joined with nearby St. Peter's Chapel to form Middleham and St. Peter's Episcopal Parish in the Episcopal Diocese of Maryland. The parish's current rector is the Rev. David Showers.

Gallery

References

External links

, including undated photo, at Maryland Historical Trust

Churches on the National Register of Historic Places in Maryland
Churches completed in 1748
Episcopal church buildings in Maryland
Churches in Calvert County, Maryland
Historic American Buildings Survey in Maryland
18th-century Episcopal church buildings
National Register of Historic Places in Calvert County, Maryland